Walter A. Mayer (July 8, 1890 – November 18, 1951) was a backup catcher in Major League Baseball who played from  through  for the Chicago White Sox (1911–1912, 1914–1915), Boston Red Sox (1917–1918) and St. Louis Browns (1919). He was born in Cincinnati.

In a seven-season career, Mayer was a .193 hitter (53-for-274) with 22 runs and 20 RBI in 132 games, including 14 doubles, one triple, one stolen base, and a .303 on-base percentage. He did not hit a home run. In 112 catching appearances, he committed 17 errors in 553 chances for a .968 fielding percentage.

Mayer died in Minnetonka, Minnesota at age 61.

External links

Retrosheet

1890 births
1951 deaths
Boston Red Sox players
Chicago White Sox players
St. Louis Browns players
Major League Baseball catchers
Baseball players from Cincinnati
Birmingham Barons players
St. Paul Saints (AA) players
Milwaukee Brewers (minor league) players
Providence Grays (minor league) players
Minneapolis Millers (baseball) players
Little Rock Travelers players
Greenville Spinners players
Spartanburg Spartans players